Latastia  caeruleopunctata, also known as Parker's long-tailed lizard, is a species of lizard found in Ethiopia and Kenya.

References

Reptiles described in 1935
Latastia
Taxa named by Hampton Wildman Parker